The 2014–15 Biathlon World Cup – Sprint Women started on Saturday December 6, 2014 in Östersund and finished on Friday March 20, 2015 in Khanty-Mansiysk. The defending titlist Kaisa Mäkäräinen of Finland finished on the 2nd place. Darya Domracheva of Belarus won the title.

Competition format
The  sprint race is the third oldest biathlon event; the distance is skied over three laps. The biathlete shoots two times at any shooting lane, first prone, then standing, totalling 10 targets. For each missed target the biathlete has to complete a penalty lap of around 150 metres. Competitors' starts are staggered, normally by 30 seconds.

2013–14 Top 3 Standings

Medal winners

Standings

References

Sprint Women